Man in the Shadow, released in the United States as Violent Stranger,  is a 1957 British crime film directed by Montgomery Tully and starring Zachary Scott and Faith Domergue.

The film had to be retitled for the US market because of the release of the American film of the same name in the same year.

Cast
 Zachary Scott as John Lewis Sullivan
 Faith Domergue as Barbara Peters
 Peter Illing as Carlo Raffone
 Faith Brook as Joan Lennox
 John Welsh as Inspector Hunt
 Julian Strange as Detective Sergeant
 Gordon Jackson as Jimmy Norris
 Kay Callard as Pamela Norris 
 Harold Siddons as Colin Wells
 John Horsley as Alan Peters
 Fabia Drake as Sister Veronica

References

External links
 
 

1957 films
1957 crime drama films
British black-and-white films
British crime drama films
Films directed by Montgomery Tully
1950s English-language films
1950s British films